Mount Granholm is a mountain  high,  southeast of Mount Pittard in the northwest part of the Admiralty Mountains of Victoria Land, Antarctica. The mountain lies situated on the Pennell Coast, a portion of Antarctica lying between Cape Williams and Cape Adare.     Mount Granholm on Google Maps    

This topographical feature was first mapped by the United States Geological Survey from surveys and U.S. Navy aerial photographs, 1960–63. Mount Granholm was so named by the Advisory Committee on Antarctic Names for Dr. Nels H. Granholm, a United States Antarctic Research Program biologist at Hallett Station during 1967–68.    
While in Antarctica, Dr. Granholm studied growth centers in the Adélie penguin embryo. A large Adélie colony continues to live on the Hallett Peninsula. Hallet Station, however, has been decommissioned.

References 

Mountains of Victoria Land
Pennell Coast